Tamer of Tigers (released in English as Tiger Girl) is a 1955 Soviet-era comedy film released by Lenfilm, directed by Nadezhda Kosheverova and Aleksandr Ivanovsky. It was billed as a "lyrical and eccentric comedy". This film was the debut of Soviet actress Lyudmila Kasatkina. The film premiered in the USSR on 11 March 1955. The film deals with the romantic intrigues and longings of a small Russian circus family and those around them.

Plot 
Lena Vorontsova is the daughter of circus performers. Having fallen in love with the circus, for the incredible atmosphere that reigns in the arena and behind the scenes, she dreams of becoming a tamer. But so far she only cares for animals. The director invites motorcycle racer Fyodor Ermolaev to display an incredibly spectacular show number, right under the circus cupola. Lena is to assist him. The sailor Pyotr Mokin is hopelessly in love with Lena. But the girl’s heart belongs to Fyodor. He is also not indifferent to her but prefers to hide his feelings. The tamer Almazov is fired for addiction to alcohol and violation of discipline. Now the place of the tamer is vacant, and Vorontsova can make her cherished dream come true. Overcoming her fear, she starts to work, and tigers submit to her strong character to become obedient. She has to choose between a timer's career and touring with a loved one as his assistant. Lena decides to follow an old dream. Ermolaev rents a room with an accountant, his daughter Olga dances in a circus corps de ballet, and her parents want to marry her to an artist. She takes the position of an assistant on tour, instead of Vorontsova. Fyodor can't overcome his longing from Lena. He regrets not revealing his feelings to Lena. The motorcycle racer finds out that at the next performance Lena will show her number with the tigers. He hurries to confess her love, just in time. The couple gains long-awaited happiness.

Cast

Main roles
Lyudmila Kasatkina — Yelena "Lena" Vorontsova
Pavel Kadochnikov — Fyodor Nikolayevich Yermolayev
Leonid Bykov — Petya Mokin
Pavel Suhanov — Nikita Antonovich
Konstantin Sorokin — Ferapont Ilyich, father of Olechka (Olga)
Glikeriya Bogdanova-Chesnokova — Matiya Mikhailovna, mother of Olechkа (Olga)
Nina Urgant — Olechka (Olga)
Tatyana Pelttser — Emmy Styepanovna Vorontsova, mother of the main heroine
Alexander Alexandrovich Orlov — Vasiliy Valiliyevich Vorobtsov, father of the main heroine
Sergey Filippov — Kazimir Almazov
Anatoliy Korolkevich — Mogikan
Nikolay Trofimov — Myshkin

Supporting roles and substitutions
Names of the following persons mentioned on the cine-film: 
Pyotr Lobanov — Uncle Vasya
Mikhail Ivanov — guitar player on the tug boat
Margarita Nazarova — stunt double for Kasatkina in the scenes with tigers
Vladimir Tsvetkov — the ringmaster

Accolades
Tamer of Tigers received a Diploma at the Second International Film Festival in Durban, South Africa, under its English name, Tiger Girl.

See also

Mister X (1958 film)
 Striped Trip

References

External links
 

Soviet historical comedy films
1950s historical comedy films
1955 musical comedy films
1955 films
Mosfilm films
1950s Russian-language films
Films directed by Nadezhda Kosheverova
Cold War Soviet intelligence films
Films about accountants